Phyllanthus gentryi is a species of plant in the family Phyllanthaceae. It is endemic to Panama.  It is threatened by habitat loss.

References

gentryi
Endangered plants
Endemic flora of Panama
Taxonomy articles created by Polbot